Catherine Barbaroux (born 1 April 1949) is a French politician who previously served as the acting president of the political movement En Marche!, after she succeeded Emmanuel Macron following his election as President of France.

Early life
Catherine Barbaroux was born on 1 April 1949. Her parents were immigrants from Spain; her grandparents worked as miners in Asturias. Her father was a member of the French Communist Party.

Barbaroux graduated from Sciences Po in 1975.

Career
Barbaroux worked as an advisor to Trade Minister Michel Crépeau from 1981 to 1986. She worked in human resources for Prisunic and Pinault-Printemps-Redoute (now known as Kering) from 1986 to 1993. She worked as an advisor to Employment Ministers Martine Aubry, Élisabeth Guigou, François Fillon and Jean-Louis Borloo from 1999 to 2005. She joined the regional council of Île-de-France in 2005, and she later became its director of services. She was the president of the Association pour le droit à l'initiative économique (Adie), an employment organization, from 2011 to 2017.

In May 2017, Barbaroux became the acting president of En Marche!.

Personal life
Barbaroux is married, with two children.

References

1949 births
French people of Spanish descent
Sciences Po alumni
La République En Marche! politicians
21st-century French women politicians
Living people